The Alto Rhapsody, Op. 53, is a composition for contralto, male chorus, and orchestra by Johannes Brahms, a setting of verses from Johann Wolfgang von Goethe's Harzreise im Winter. It was written in 1869, as a wedding gift for Robert and Clara Schumann's daughter, Julie. Brahms scholars have long speculated that the composer may have had romantic feelings for Julie, which he may have integrated into the text and music of the Alto Rhapsody. The text, with its metaphysical portrayal of a misanthropic soul who is urged to find spiritual sustenance and throw off the shackles of his suffering, has powerful parallels in Brahms's life and character.

The work is in three sections: the first two, in a chromatically dense and wandering C minor, are for the soloist and orchestra and describe the pain of the misanthropic wanderer. The second section is an aria in all but name. The third section, in a nominal C major, brings in the male chorus, which joins the soloist in a plea to a celestial spirit for an abatement of the wanderer's pain.  The third part of the Rhapsody has similarities of vocal and choral style to A German Requiem, which was written the previous year.

The work typically takes between twelve and fifteen minutes in performance. See recordings, below, for indicative timings.

The work was first "tried out" on 6 October 1869, at the dress rehearsal for the Karlsruhe season's first orchestral subscription concert. Amalia Boni sang the solo part; the conductor Hermann Levi was on hand, but there was no male voice chorus, and it is unclear whether Boni was accompanied by orchestra or simply on piano.  Brahms and Clara Schumann were present, but there was certainly no other audience.  It received its first public performance, and its first definitely known proper performance, on 3 March 1870, at Jena. The soloist at the first performance was Pauline Viardot and the conductor was Ernst Naumann.

The text Brahms set is:
Aber abseits wer ist's?
Im Gebüsch verliert sich sein Pfad;
hinter ihm schlagen die Sträuche zusammen,
das Gras steht wieder auf,
die Öde verschlingt ihn.

Ach, wer heilet die Schmerzen
dess, dem Balsam zu Gift ward?
Der sich Menschenhaß
aus der Fülle der Liebe trank!
Erst verachtet, nun ein Verächter,
zehrt er heimlich auf
seinen eigenen Wert
In ungenügender Selbstsucht.

Ist auf deinem Psalter,
Vater der Liebe, ein Ton
seinem Ohre vernehmlich,
so erquicke sein Herz!
Öffne den umwölkten Blick
über die tausend Quellen
neben dem Durstenden
in der Wüste!
But who is that apart?
His path disappears in the bushes;
behind him the branches spring together;
the grass stands up again;
the wasteland engulfs him.

Ah, who heals the pains
of him for whom balsam turned to poison?
Who drank hatred of man
from the abundance of love?
First scorned, now a scorner,
he secretly feeds on
his own merit,
in unsatisfying egotism.

If there is on your psaltery,
Father of love, one note
his ear can hear,
then refresh his heart!
Open his clouded gaze
to the thousand springs
next to him who thirsts
in the wilderness!

Recordings
The Alto Rhapsody is not frequently performed in concert, perhaps because of the expense of hiring a soloist and chorus for a short piece, but it has been recorded many times both by contralto and mezzo-soprano singers. A selection of recordings available 2012 illustrates the wide range of tempi adopted by different interpreters of the Rhapsody, with playing duration ranging from 11 minutes 15 seconds to 16 minutes 10 seconds.

References 

 West, Ewan: Notes to EMI CD CDM 7 69650 2
 Stone, John: Notes to HMV CD 5 68014 2

Further reading

External links
 
 
 Detailed listening guide using a recording conducted by Claudio Abbado

Choral compositions
Compositions by Johannes Brahms
1869 compositions
Rhapsodies
Musical settings of poems by Johann Wolfgang von Goethe